Discoveries is a Canadian youth science television series which aired on CBC Television in 1957.

Premise
This Winnipeg-produced science show was geared towards youth ages 12 to 14. Some episodes featured Manitoba Museum curator Dick Sutton presenting segments on nature and its history. In March 1957, the series featured Manitoba Telephone System executive R. P. Coats who demonstrated principles of telecommunications by presenting basic, easily  constructed devices. University of Manitoba greenhouse operator Stan Westaway taught about plants, trees and vegetables during the May 1957 broadcasts. Rod Mackenzie, a Winnipeg secondary school teacher, hosted the final three episodes of Discoveries on the topic of electricity.

This series is distinct from an Ann Arbor, Michigan-produced Discoveries science series which was presented by Mary Lela Grimes and broadcast on CBC Television from July to September 1959.

Scheduling
This 15-minute series was broadcast on Fridays at 5:00 p.m. (Eastern) from 8 February to 28 June 1957.

References

External links
 

CBC Television original programming
1950s Canadian children's television series
1957 Canadian television series debuts
1957 Canadian television series endings
Black-and-white Canadian television shows
Science education television series
Television shows filmed in Winnipeg